An organic nuclear reactor, or organic cooled reactor (OCR), is a type of nuclear reactor that uses some form of organic fluid, typically a hydrocarbon substance like polychlorinated biphenyl (PCB), for cooling and sometimes as a neutron moderator as well.

Using an organic fluid had a major advantage over conventional designs using water as the coolant. Water tends to corrode and dissolve metals, both the nuclear fuel and the reactor as a whole. To avoid corrosion of the fuel, it is formed into cylindrical pellets and then inserted in zirconium tubes or other "cladding" materials. The rest of the reactor has to be built out of materials that are both corrosion resistant and resistant to the effects of neutron embrittlement. In contrast, many common organic fluids are less corrosive to metals, allowing the fuel assemblies to be much simpler and the coolant pipes to be built of normal carbon steels instead of more expensive corrosion-resistant metals. Some organics also have the advantage that they do not flash into gas in the same fashion as water, which may reduce or eliminate the need for a containment building. 

These benefits are offset to a degree by the fact that organics also generally have a lower specific heat than water, and thus require higher flow rates to provide the same amount of cooling. A more significant problem was found in experimental devices; the high-energy neutrons given off as part of the nuclear reactions have much greater energy than the chemical bonds in the coolant, and they break the hydrocarbons apart. This results in the release of hydrogen and various shorter-chain hydrocarbons. The polymerization of the resulting products can turn into a thick tar-like state. Further, many suitable coolants are naturally flammable and sometimes toxic, which adds new safety concerns. Many uses of PCBs were banned beginning in the 1970s as their environmental toxicity was better understood.

The OCR concept was a major area of research in the 1950s and 60s, including the Organic Moderated Reactor Experiment at the Idaho National Engineering Laboratory, the Piqua Nuclear Generating Station in Ohio, and the Canadian WR-1 at Whiteshell Laboratories. The US experiments explored the use of organics for both cooling and moderation, while the Canadian design used a heavy water moderator, as did the unbuilt EURATOM ORGEL and Danish DOR designs. Ultimately none of these would be used for commercial generators, and only the small experimental reactors at Piqua in the US and Arbus at the Research Institute of Atomic Reactors in the USSR ever generated power, and then only experimentally.

Physics

Fission basics
Conventional fission power plants rely on the chain reaction caused when nuclear fission events release neutrons that cause further fission events. Each fission event in uranium releases two or three neutrons, so by careful arrangement and the use of various absorber materials, you can balance the system so one of those neutrons causes another fission event while the other one or two are lost. This careful balance is known as criticality.

Natural uranium is a mix of several isotopes, mainly a trace amount of U-235 and over 99% U-238. When they undergo fission, both of these isotopes release fast neutrons with an energy distribution peaking around 1 to 2 MeV. This energy is too low to cause fission in U-238, which means it cannot sustain a chain reaction. U-235 will undergo fission when struck by neutrons of this energy, so it is possible for U-235 to sustain a chain reaction, as is the case in a nuclear bomb. However, there is too little U-235 in a mass of natural uranium, and the chance any given neutron will cause fission in these isolated atoms is not high enough to reach criticality. Criticality is accomplished by concentrating, or enriching, the fuel, increasing the amount of U-235 to produce enriched uranium, while the leftover, now mostly U-238, is a waste product known as depleted uranium.

U-235 will undergo fission more easily if the neutrons are of lower energy, the so-called thermal neutrons. Neutrons can be slowed to thermal energies through collisions with a neutron moderator material, the most obvious being the hydrogen atoms found in water. By placing the fission fuel in water, the probability that the neutrons will cause fission in another U-235 is greatly increased, which means the level of enrichment needed to reach criticality is greatly reduced. This leads to the concept of reactor-grade enriched uranium, with the amount of U-235 increased from less than 1% to between 3 and 5% depending on the reactor design. This is in contrast to weapons-grade enrichment, which increases the U-235 enrichment to, commonly, over 90%.

Coolants and moderators
When a neutron is moderated, its kinetic energy is transferred to the moderator material. This causes it to heat up, and by removing this heat, energy is extracted from the reactor. Water makes an excellent material for this role, both because it is an effective moderator, as well as being easily pumped and used with existing power generation equipment similar to the systems developed for steam turbines in coal fired power plants. The main disadvantage of water is that it has a relatively low boiling point, and the efficiency in extracting the energy using a turbine is a function of the operational temperature. 

The most common design for nuclear power plants is the pressurized water reactor (PWR), in which the water is held under pressure, on the order of 150 atmospheres, in order to raise its boiling point. These designs may operate at temperatures as high as 345 °C, which greatly improves the amount of heat that any unit of water can remove from the core, as well as improving the efficiency when it is converted to steam in the generator side of the plant. The main downside to this design is that keeping water at this pressure adds complexity, and if the pressure drops, it can flash into steam and cause a steam explosion. To avoid this, reactors generally use a strong containment building or some form of active steam suppression.

A number of alternative designs have emerged that use alternative coolants or moderators. For instance, the UK's program concentrated on the use of graphite as the moderator and carbon dioxide gas as the coolant. These reactors, the Magnox and AGR operated at roughly twice the temperature as conventional water-cooled plants. This not only increases the efficiency of the turbomachinery, but is designed to allow it to run with existing coal-fired equipment that runs at the same temperature. However, they had the disadvantage of being extremely large, which added to their capital costs.

In contrast, the Canadian CANDU designs used two separate masses of heavy water, one acting as the moderator in a large tank known as the calandria, and another acting solely as the coolant in a conventional pressurized loop. This design did not have the entire coolant mass under pressure, which simplified the construction of the reactor. The primary advantage was that the neutron moderation of heavy water is superior to normal water, which allowed these plants to run on natural, unenriched, uranium fuel. However, this was at the cost of using expensive heavy water.

Organic coolants and moderators
In conventional water-cooled designs, a significant amount of effort is needed to ensure that the materials making up the reactor do not dissolve or corrode into the water. Many common low-corrosion materials are not suitable for reactor use because they are not strong enough to withstand the high pressures being used, or are too easily weakened by exposure to neutron damage. This includes the fuel assemblies, which in most water-cooled designs are cast into a ceramic form and clad in zirconium to avoid them dissolving into the coolant.

Selected organic-based coolants avoid this problem because they are hydrophobic and generally do not corrode metals. This is why they are often used as anti-corrosion agents and rustproofing. Greatly reducing corrosion allows the complexity of many of the reactor parts to be simplified, and fuel elements no longer require exotic formulations. In most examples the fuel was refined uranium metal in pure form with a simple cladding of stainless steel or aluminum.

In the simplest organic reactor designs, one simply replaces just the coolant with the organic fluid. This is most easily accomplished when the moderator was originally separate, as is the case in the UK and Canadian designs. In this case, one can modify the existing designs to become the 'graphite moderated, organic cooled reactor' and 'heavy water moderated, organic cooled reactor', respectively. Possible moderators other than graphite or organic fluid include beryllium, beryllium oxide, and zirconium hydride.

However, the US program, by far the largest, concentrated on the 'organic moderated and cooled reactor' design, which is conceptually similar to the pressurized water reactor, simply replacing the water with a suitable organic material. In this case the organic material is both the coolant and moderator, which places additional design limitations on the layout of the reactor. However, this is also the simplest solution from a construction and operational point of view, and saw significant development in the US, where the PWR design was already common.

Another common design in US use is the boiling water reactor (BWR). In this design the water is placed under less pressure and allowed to boil in the reactor core. This limits the operational temperature, but is simpler mechanically as it eliminates the need for a separate steam generator and its associated piping and pumps. One can adapt this design to an organic moderated and cooled reactor cycle as well, which is aided by the fact that suitable organic fluids superheat on their own when they expand into the gas state, which can simplify the overall design.

This last issue also has a significant safety benefit; in contrast to water, oils do not flash into steam, and thus there is no real possibility of a steam explosion. Other potential explosion sources in water-cooled designs also include the buildup of hydrogen gas caused when the zirconium cladding heats; lacking such a cladding, or any similar material anywhere in the reactor, the only source of hydrogen gas in an oil-cooled design is from the chemical breakdown of the coolant. This occurs at a relatively predictable rate, and the possibility of a hydrogen buildup is extremely remote. This greatly reduces the required containment systems.

Disadvantages
Organic-based coolants have several disadvantages as well. Among these is their relatively low heat transfer capability, roughly half that of water, which requires increased flow rates to remove the same amount of energy. Another issue is that they tend to decompose at high temperatures, and although a wide variety of potential materials were examined, only a few appeared to be stable at reasonable operational temperatures, and none could be expected to operate for extended periods above 530 C. Most are also flammable, and some are toxic, which presents safety issues.

Another issue, when the oil is also the moderator, is that the moderating capability of the fluid increases as its temperature cools. This means that as the moderator heats up, it has less moderating capacity, which causes the overall reaction rate of the reactor to slow and further cool the reactor. Normally this is an important safety feature, in water-moderated reactors the opposite may occur and reactors with positive void coefficients are inherently unstable. However, in the case of an oil moderator, the temperature coefficient is so strong that it can rapidly cool. This makes it very difficult to throttle such designs for load following.

But far and away the largest problem for hydrocarbon coolants was that it decomposed when exposed to radiation, an effect known as radiolysis. In contrast the heat-based decomposition, which tends to make lighter hydrocarbons, the outcome of these reactions was highly variable and resulted in many different reaction products. Water also undergoes decomposition due to radiation, but the output products are hydrogen and oxygen, which are easily recombined into water again. The resultant products of the decomposition of oils were not readily recombined, and had to be removed.

One particularly worrying type of reaction occurred when the resulting products polymerized into long-chain molecules. The concern was that these would form large masses within the reactor, and especially its cooling loops, and might "exert significant deleterious effects on the operation of a reactor." It was polymerization of the coolant sticking to the fuel cladding that led to the shutdown of the Piqua reactor after only three years of operation.

History

Early experiments
Early theoretical work on the organic cooled concept was carried out at the Argonne National Laboratory between 1953 and 1956. As part of this work, Mine Safety Appliances studied a variety of potential biphenyl coolants. In 1956-75, Aerojet conducted studies on the rate of "burnout" of polyphenyl coolants, and in the following two years, Hanford Atomic Products carried out several studies of polyphenyl irradiation.

Monsanto began operating a single coolant loop in the Brookhaven Graphite Research Reactor beginning in 1955 to study heat transfer, and in 1958 began to consider coolant reclamation and studies on boiling diphenyl coolant loops. Atomic Energy of Canada Limited (AECL) began similar studies around the same time, with an eye to the design of a future test reactor.

A similar program began in the UK at Harwell in the 1950s. This soon focussed on radiation damage to organic compounds, specifically polyphenyls. Around 1960, Euratom began studies of such designs as part of their ORGEL project. A similar but separate project began in Italy under the direction of the Comitato nazionale per l'energia nucleare, but their PRO design was never built. Likewise, a major study carried out in Denmark considered the heavy water-moderated reactor.

Major experiments
The first complete organically cooled and moderated reactor design was the Organic Moderated Reactor Experiment (OMRE), which began construction at the Idaho National Laboratory in 1955 and went critical in 1957. This used Santowax (a terphenyl) for coolant and moderation and operation was generally acceptable. The reactor was a very low-energy design, producing 15 MW thermal, and operated for only a short period between 1957 and 1963. During this time the core was rebuilt three times to test different fuels, coolants and operating conditions from 260 to 370 C. It was planned that a larger 40 MW design, the terphenyl-cooled Experimental Organic Cooled Reactor (EOCR), would take over from the OMRE. It began construction at Idaho in 1962, but was never loaded with fuel when the AEC shifted their focus mostly to light water reactors. 

The next major reactor was a commercial prototype built as a private/public venture, the Piqua Nuclear Generating Station, which began construction in 1963 at Piqua, Ohio. This used the same Santowax coolant as the original OMRE, but was as large as the EOCR, producing 45 MW thermal and 15 MW electrical. It ran on 1.5% enriched fuel formed into annular tubes that were clad in finned aluminum casings. It ran only for a short time until 1966, when it was shut down due to films building up on the fuel cladding, formed from radiation degraded coolant. 

The most powerful ONR was the Canadian 60 MW thermal WR-1. It began construction at the newly formed Whiteshell Laboratories in Manitoba in 1965 and went critical late that year. WR-1 used heavy water as the moderator and terphenyls as the coolant, and did not suffer from the problems with coolant breakdown seen in the US designs. It operated until 1985, by which time AECL had standardized on using heavy water for both the moderator and the coolant, and the organic cooled design was no longer being considered for development.

Although various European nations did development work on organic reactor designs, only the Soviet Union built one. Work on the 5 MW thermal Arbus NPS began in Melekess, Russia in 1963 and it ran until 1979. It produced a maximum of 750 kW of electricity. In 1979 it was rebuilt as the AST-1, this time to deliver 12 MW of process heat instead of electrical power. It ran in this form until 1988.

Renewed interest
Indian officials have periodically expressed interest in reviving the concept. They initially received CANDU design materials during the period of the WR-1 experiment. To further lower operational costs, there have been several revivals of the WR-1-like concept. It is believed that an organic coolant purification system can be developed to handle the decomposition of the organic coolant, and research has begun to this effect. However, no experimental system has been constructed.

References

Citations

Bibliography
 
 
 
 

Nuclear reactors